Kłosów may refer to the following places in Poland:
Kłosów, Lower Silesian Voivodeship (south-west Poland)
Kłosów, West Pomeranian Voivodeship (north-west Poland)